Lahr is a surname. Notable people with the surname include:

Bert Lahr (1895–1967), born Irving Lahrheim, American actor of Jewish German descent
Jane Lahr (born 1943), daughter of Bert Lahr, sister of John Lahr
John Lahr (born 1941), American theater critic
Charles Lahr (1885–1971), German-born Londoner anarchist, bookseller and publisher
Warren Lahr (1923–1969), professional American Football player